Wang Sing-nan (born 27 June 1941) is the caucus whip for the Democratic Progressive Party in the Legislative Yuan of the Republic of China on Taiwan. He has represented the electoral district of Tainan City since February 2005. On 10 October 1976, he sent a mail bomb to then-Governor of Taiwan Province Hsieh Tung-min, who suffered serious injuries to both hands as a result. He was sentenced to life imprisonment for this and was imprisoned in the Green Island Prison until then-President Lee Teng-hui granted him clemency in 1990.

References

1941 births
Democratic Progressive Party Members of the Legislative Yuan
Taiwan independence activists
Living people
Prisoners sentenced to life imprisonment by Taiwan
Taiwanese prisoners sentenced to life imprisonment
Tainan Members of the Legislative Yuan
Party List Members of the Legislative Yuan
Members of the 4th Legislative Yuan
Members of the 5th Legislative Yuan
Members of the 6th Legislative Yuan
Members of the 7th Legislative Yuan
Taiwanese politicians convicted of crimes
Bombers (people)